Îlham Ehmed (Arabic: إلهام أحمد), also rendered as Îlham Ahmed, is a Syrian politician from the Democratic Union Party currently serving as the co-president of the Executive Council of the Autonomous Administration of North and East Syria (Rojava) and member of the executive committee of the Movement for a Democratic Society (TEV-DEM) coalition. Until July 2018, she was a co-chair of the Syrian Democratic Council (SDC), a political wing of the Syrian Democratic Forces that acts as the legislature for Rojava.

Life and career 
An ethnic Kurd born in Afrin, Ehmed has been outspoken on the aim of a programmatically polyethnic character of a future Syria. At the start of the second Raqqa campaign in November 2016, she said:Such an administration could provide a good example for democratic change in Raqqa, especially that the city has been for years a de facto capital for the ISIS terrorist group. This accomplishment would be a major change in the overall situation in Syria, and would help the country move towards stability, democratic change. Raqqa will be an example for the whole country.Having been involved with the Kurdish nationalist movement since the 1990s, Ehmed seeks have a decentralized government in the form of a federalized Syria. She claims that local civilian councils and governments would emerge in Syrian Kurdistan in such a decentralized state that guarantee the rights of different Syrian groups, including freedom of speech, and gender equality. She advocates for the rights of the Kurdish people to be guaranteed in the Syrian constitution.

Ehmed took part in negotiations with the Syrian government in Damascus concerning services that shall be provided also in the areas governed by the SDC in July 2018.

Negotiations with France 
After both Turkey's threat to attack Afrin and U.S. President Donald Trump's declaration that the United States would withdraw its troops from the territories governed by the SDC in December 2018, Ehmed travelled to Paris with SDC co-chair Riad Darar to talk with the French government about further cooperation with the French troops stationed in the areas governed by the SDC. This left Ehmed and the SDC vulnerable to an attack from Turkey on Northeastern Syria. French troops would remain in Syria following negotiations with France.

References

External links

Interview with Al-Monitor (December 2016)

Democratic Union Party (Syria) politicians
Living people
People of the Syrian civil war
Year of birth missing (living people)
Kurdish politicians